Richard Kyle Morris (born 26 September 1987) is an English cricketer who played first-class cricket for Loughborough University.

Morris joined Hampshire but was unable to break into the first team and was released by the club at the end of the 2008 County Championship. Since 2009 he has played for Berkshire in the Minor Counties Championship and was a member of the Berkshire teams that won four consecutive titles from 2016 to 2019.

References

External links
 

1987 births
Alumni of Loughborough University
Living people
Loughborough MCCU cricketers
People from Newbury, Berkshire
Berkshire cricketers
English cricketers
English cricketers of the 21st century